Benjamin Pranter (born 22 September 1989) is an Austrian footballer who plays for SC Schwaz.

Club career
On 18 July 2021, he joined SC Schwaz in the third-tier Regionalliga Tirol.

References

External links
 

1989 births
People from Innsbruck-Land District
Footballers from Tyrol (state)
Living people
Austrian footballers
Austria youth international footballers
Association football forwards
WSG Tirol players
FC Wacker Innsbruck (2002) players
2. Liga (Austria) players
Austrian Football Bundesliga players
Austrian Regionalliga players